Chiswick Road station is a light rail station on the MBTA's Green Line B branch, located in the median of Commonwealth Avenue north of Chiswick Road in the Brighton neighborhood of Boston, Massachusetts.  Chiswick Road consists of two side platforms, which serve the B branch's two tracks.

History
In 2003, Chiswick Road was one of five stops on the B branch proposed for closure, due to having a low average daily ridership and being located quite close to nearby, better-used stops.  Chiswick Road was dropped from the proposal shortly after it was announced due to opposition from residents of a local housing project for the elderly served by the stop. The other four stops (Fordham Road, Summit Avenue, Mount Hood Road, and Greycliff Road) were provisionally closed on April 20, 2004, which was made permanent on March 15, 2005.

Track work in 2018–19, which included replacement of platform edges at several stops, triggered requirements for accessibility modifications at those stops. By December 2022, design for Chiswick Road and four other B Branch stops was 30% complete, with construction expected to last from fall 2023 to mid-2024.

References

External links

MBTA - Chiswick Road
Station from Google Maps Street View

Brighton, Boston
Green Line (MBTA) stations
Railway stations in Boston